Abreeza Mall is a large shopping mall complex located at J.P. Laurel Avenue, Bajada in Davao City, Philippines. It is the first Ayala Shopping Center located in Mindanao. It opened on May 12, 2011. It is owned by Accendo Commercial Corporation, a joint venture company of Ayala Land and Anflocor.

The 4-story mall lies within a 4-hectare space of the 10-hectare commercial complex. Also in the same complex stands a 4-storey Robinson's Mall. At least three hectares of the entire property will be sold for residential or commercial purposes, including a hotel and residential condominium  projects Abreeza Residences and Abreeza Place.

Seda Abreeza 
Seda Hotel is a 12-storey hotel owned by Ayala Land which has 186 rooms.

Abreeza-Ayala Corporate Center 
Abreeza Corporate Center is an 8-story information technology (IT) center right beside the existing Abreeza Mall. The first three floors of the IT center will be dedicated to the retail expansion of the mall within the project. The remaining floors will be the office portion of the building that accommodates the business process outsourcing companies.

External links 
Abreeza Official website

See also 

 Ayala Malls

References 

Shopping malls in Davao City
Mixed-use developments in the Philippines
Shopping malls established in 2011
Ayala Malls